The 1932 Montana Grizzlies football team was an American football team that represented the University of Montana in the 1932 college football season as a member of the Pacific Coast Conference (PCC). In its second season under head coach Bunny Oakes, the team compiled a 2–7 record (0–5 in conference), finished in last place in the PCC, and was outscored by a total of 224 to 84. The team played its home games at Dornblaser Field.

Schedule

References

Montana
Montana Grizzlies football seasons
Montana Grizzlies football